KVNA-FM (100.1 FM, "100.One") is a commercial radio station in Flagstaff, Arizona broadcasting an Adult Album Alternative format.  It is one of six radio stations in the Flagstaff-Prescott region of Northern Arizona owned by the Yavapai Broadcasting Corporation.

History

KLOD
In the Summer of 1999, 100.1 MHz signed on broadcasting the syndicated LoudRadio hard rock format. The original call letters KLOD, were branded to launch the new Active Rock programming. KLOD was the first station in the United States to broadcast an online commercial radio network. LoudRadio was launched by veteran broadcaster Guy Guiliano, via the Napa, California-based eMusic company.

In the Spring of 2001, the format was changed to Smooth Jazz branded as The Cat. The new format was programmed by veteran entertainer Robert Shields.  The format lasted less than one year as programming was changed to Hot Adult Contemporary branded as Star 100.1.

On January 1, 2005, the format was changed to Adult Contemporary and branded as Sunny FM adopting the format that was formerly on 97.5 known as Sunny 97. Prior to changing format to adult contemporary the station was known as The Heat 97.5 a Top 40 Oriented radio station, the frequency 97.5 FM which moved to Dewey-Humboldt to serve the Phoenix area. For more information, see KMVA.

On December 30, 2014, at midnight, the "Sunny" Adult Contemporary format moved to KVNA 600 AM, along with its FM translator station on 104.7, while 100.1 FM flipped to adult album alternative music, branded as "100.One, Arizona's Adult Alternative". The first song on 100.One, according to the online playlist, was I'm Not the Only One by Sam Smith.

KVNA
On May 18, 2005, the KVNA-FM call letters of the original "Sunny FM" on 97.5 FM were adopted.

External links
 100.One KVNA-FM official website
 
 
 
 LoudRadio Debuts | Arizona Daily Sun

VNA
Adult album alternative radio stations in the United States
Radio stations established in 1999
1999 establishments in Arizona